Karsten Johansen (born 11 April 1981) is a Danish professional football forward, who currently plays for the Danish 1st Division side Næstved BK.

External links
 Brøndby IF profile
Career statistics at Danmarks Radio

1981 births
Living people
Danish men's footballers
Brøndby IF players
Næstved Boldklub players
Randers FC players
Danish Superliga players
Danish 1st Division players

Association football forwards